Xaysetha  Xaysetha district is a district of Vientiane Prefecture.

References

Populated places in Vientiane Prefecture